Samoa competed at the 2022 Commonwealth Games in Birmingham, England between 28 July and 8 August 2022. It was Samoa's thirteenth appearance at the Games. On 13 July 2022 SASNOC announced a team of 38 athletes competing in seven sports would represent Samoa.

Medalists

Competitors
The following is the list of number of competitors participating at the Games per sport/discipline.

Athletics

A squad of eight athletes was announced on 13 July 2022.

Men
Track and road events

Field events

Women
Field events

Boxing

A squad of three boxers was announced on 13 July 2022.

Men

Judo

One judoka was officially selected as of 13 July 2022.

Men

Rugby sevens

As of 9 March 2022, Samoa qualified for the men's tournament. This was achieved through their positions in the 2018–19 / 2019–20 World Rugby Sevens Series.

The thirteen-man roster was announced on 13 July 2022.

Summary

Men's tournament

Roster
 
Fa'afoi Falaniko
Iafeta Purcell
Levi Milford
Melani Matavao
Motu Opetai
Neueli Leitufia
Owen Niue
Paul Scanlan
Steve Onosai
Taunu'u Niulevaea
Uaina Sione
Va'a Apelu Maliko
Vaovasa Afa

Pool A

Quarterfinals

5th-8th Semifinals

5th Place Match

Swimming

A squad of four swimmers was announced on 13 July 2022.

Men

Women

Mixed

Weightlifting

Six weightlifters qualified for the competition by virtue of their positions in the IWF Commonwealth Ranking List.

Wrestling

A squad of two wrestlers was selected as of 27 June 2022.

References

External links
SASNOC Official site

Nations at the 2022 Commonwealth Games
Samoa at the Commonwealth Games
2022 in Samoan sport